The IMAM Ro.51 was an Italian fighter aircraft that first flew in 1937. It was designed for the 1936 new fighter contest for the Regia Aeronautica, with practically all the Italian aircraft builders involved.

Design
The aircraft, designed by the engineer Galasso, was a single-seat, monoplane fighter, of mixed construction (the wings were made of wood), and initially with a fixed undercarriage.

The engine was standard for this generation of fighters, an  Fiat A.74 RC 38 radial powering a three-blade propeller.

The fixed undercarriage limited the maximum speed to only 467 km/h. It was armed with two Breda-SAFAT 12.7 mm machine guns.

Development
In June 1938 the first prototype, initially fitted with a very small tail, was tested and found inferior to the Macchi C.200 and Fiat G.50. It was overall a poor aircraft. The trials to re-engineer the wing came too late and no orders were made.

The second prototype Ro.51/1, was converted into a fighter floatplane. Like the Ro.44 it had a large central float and two smaller ones under the wings. The maximum speed dropped to 430 km/h, but endurance was increased to 1,200 km.

Unfortunately during a trial one of the wings suddenly sank in the water. The rest of the aircraft swiftly followed, and the loss of this prototype meant the end of the program. Although performance was apparently fairly good, the project was overall a failure, especially in the early aspects, even if it was not too different from the Fokker D.XXI. But with so many other superior machines also involved, waiting for the problems the Ro.51 had to be fixed was not an option.

Operators

Regia Aeronautica

Specifications (Ro.51 second prototype)

See also

References

Further reading
Lembo, Daniele Officine Ferroviarie Meridionali IMAM, Aerei nella Storia magazine n.34 Nov–Dec 2003, Delta editions, Parma.

External links

Ro.51 in italiankits.it  
Drawings

Ro.51
1930s Italian fighter aircraft
Abandoned military aircraft projects of Italy
Single-engined tractor aircraft
Low-wing aircraft
Floatplanes
Aircraft first flown in 1937